East Grove can refer to:
East Grove Street District (Bloomington, Illinois)
East Grove Township, Lee County, Illinois